Fife Lake is a fresh water prairie lake in the Canadian province of Saskatchewan. It is located in the south-central part of the province at the eastern end of the Wood Mountain Hills. The entire lake and its shoreline is designated an Important Bird Area (IBA) of Canada to protect the nationally endangered piping plover. While there are no communities along the lake's shore, there is a park and campground at the southern end. Nearby communities include Fife Lake, Rockglen, and Lisieux. Access is from Highway 18.

Description 
Fife Lake a is shallow, irregularly shaped prairie lake. Its primary inflow, Hay Meadow Creek, flows into the west end of the lake from the central part of the Wood Mountain Hills. Girard Creek, the lake's outflow, is a tributary of the East Poplar River. The East Poplar River is a major tributary of the Poplar River, which connects to the Missouri River in the U.S. state of Montana.

Being a shallow prairie lake, during drought years, Fife Lake water levels drop significantly. Fife Lake had been known for great walleye fishing, but the low water levels through the late 1980s and 1990s had caused caused the fish to die off. While the lake is known for significant seasonal water level changes, the Water Security Agency said that the extreme water level changes seen at that time were related to coal mining operations  to the south-east, near Coronarch. In the spring of 2016, with water levels having recovered, the lake was re-stocked with 200,000 walleye.

Rockin Beach Regional Park 
It is run by a non-profit organisation. The park has a campground, ball diamonds, volleyball courts, hiking trails, a motocross track, and lake access with a dock and a beach for swimming. The Rockin Beach Mud Bog event is held there every August.

Important Bird Area 
The entirety of Fife Lake is part of the Fife Lake (SK 021) Important Bird Area (IBA) of Canada. It is considered a critical piping plover habitat under the provincial Wildlife Habitat Protection Act. That designation protects the lake up to the high water mark from development. The IBA site itself totals  of land with an elevation range of 800 metres to 823 metres above sea level. Besides the piping plover, other birds important to the lake include the western grebe, eared grebe, and the black-crowned night heron.

Fish species 
The most commonly found fish in the lake is the walleye.

See also 
List of lakes of Saskatchewan
Tourism in Saskatchewan
List of protected areas of Saskatchewan

References 

Lakes of Saskatchewan
Important Bird Areas of Saskatchewan
Poplar Valley No. 12, Saskatchewan
Willow Bunch No. 42, Saskatchewan